The 1942 All-SEC football team consists of American football players selected to the All-Southeastern Conference (SEC) chosen by various selectors for the 1942 college football season. Georgia won the conference. Frank Sinkwich won the Heisman Trophy.

All-SEC selections

Ends
George Poschner, Georgia (AP-1, UP-1)
Al Hust, Tennessee (AP-1, UP-2)
Marty Comer, Tulane (AP-2, UP-1)
Robert Patterson, Miss. St. (AP-2)
V. Davis, Georgia (UP-2)
Sam Sharp, Alabama (AP-3)
Jack Marshall, Georgia Tech (AP-3)

Tackles
Don Whitmire, Alabama (College Football Hall of Fame) (AP-1, UP-1)
Clyde Johnson, Kentucky (AP-1, UP-1)
Mitchell Olenski, Alabama (AP-2, UP-2)
Denver Crawford, Tennessee (AP-2)
J. H. McClurkin, Auburn (UP-2)
Gene Ellenson, Georgia (AP-3)
Richard Huffman, Tennessee (AP-3)

Guards
Harvey Hardy, Georgia Tech (AP-1, UP-1)
Walter Ruark, Georgia (AP-1, UP-2)
George Hecht, Alabama  (AP-2, UP-1)
Oscar Britt, Ole Miss (AP-3, UP-2)
Raymond Ray, Miss. St. (AP-2)
Curtis Patterson, Miss. St. (AP-3)

Centers
Joe Domnanovich, Alabama (AP-1, UP-1)
George Manning, Georgia Tech (AP-2, UP-2)
Jim Talley, LSU (AP-3)

Quarterbacks
Clint Castleberry, Georgia Tech (AP-1, UP-1)
Jack Jenkins, Vanderbilt (AP-1, UP-2)

Halfbacks
Monk Gafford, Auburn (AP-1, UP-1)
J. T. "Blondy" Black, Miss. St. (UP-1)
Bob Cifers, Tennessee (AP-2, UP-2)
Russ Craft, Alabama (AP-2, UP-2)
Walter McDonald, Tulane (AP-2)
John Black, Miss. St. (AP-2)
Lou Thomas, Tulane (AP-3)
Lamar Davis, Georgia (AP-3)
Bernie Rohling, Vanderbilt (AP-3)

Fullbacks
Frank Sinkwich, Georgia (College Football Hall of Fame) (AP-1, UP-1)
Alvin Dark, LSU (AP-3, UP-2)

Key

AP = Associated Press

UP = United Press.

Bold = Consensus first-team selection by both AP and UP

See also
1942 College Football All-America Team

References

All-SEC
All-SEC football teams